The 6 Lexington Avenue Local and <6> Pelham Bay Park Express are two rapid transit services in the A Division of the New York City Subway. Their route emblems, or "bullets", are colored  since they use the IRT Lexington Avenue Line in Manhattan. Local service is denoted by a (6) in a circular bullet, and express service is denoted by a <6> in a diamond-shaped bullet.

6 trains operate local at all times between Pelham Bay Park in the Bronx and Brooklyn Bridge–City Hall  in Lower Manhattan. During weekdays in the peak direction, <6> Pelham Express trains replace 6 local ones north of Parkchester, and run express between that station and Third Avenue–138th Street. During this time, 6 Pelham Local trains short turn at Parkchester (except for peak-direction <6> Express trains that return in the opposite direction as 6 Local trains). Weekdays from 9:00 to 11:00 a.m., select Manhattan-bound <6> trains run local from Parkchester to Hunts Point Avenue while select Parkchester-bound 6 trains run express in that section.

The 6 in its current format has run since the implementation of the IRT "H" system in 1918. Since 1920, it has remained largely unchanged, running between Pelham Bay Park and City Hall with a peak-express variant in the Bronx. In 1945, the city closed the City Hall Loop station, the 6 former southern terminal in Manhattan. Since then, most 6 trains have terminated at Brooklyn Bridge, with a few exceptions in later years.

History

Under the Interborough Rapid Transit 
On October 27, 1904, local and express service opened on the original subway in Manhattan, following the route of the present IRT Lexington Avenue Line from City Hall to Grand Central–42nd Street. From there, the service traveled west on 42nd Street on the route of the present 42nd Street Shuttle, and then north on the present IRT Broadway–Seventh Avenue Line to 145th Street.

The current "H" configuration, with separate services along Lexington Avenue and Broadway/Seventh Avenue, was introduced in 1917. Full Lexington Avenue local service from City Hall to 125th Street opened on July 17, 1918. Local service was extended to Third Avenue–138th Street on August 1, 1918.

On January 7, 1919, trains were extended from 138th Street to Hunts Point Avenue, and to East 177th Street on May 30, 1920. Service between Hunts Point Avenue and East 177th Street was originally served by a shuttle service operating with elevated cars.

On October 24, 1920, service was extended again to Westchester Square. On December 20, 1920, service was extended to Pelham Bay Park. Service to Pelham Bay Park was served by a mix of through and shuttle trains during the 1920s.

On December 21, 1925, the number of Manhattan-bound through trains in the morning rush hour, between 7 a.m. and 8 a.m., was increased from thirteen to eighteen, a 38 percent increase in service. The remainder of trains continued operating as a shuttle service to Hunts Point Avenue.

On January 28, 1931, two southbound morning rush hour trips began starting at Pelham Bay Park instead of Hunts Point Avenue. On April 13, 1931, service to Pelham Bay Park was increased. Two additional southbound trips were added, starting at Pelham Bay Park at 5:50 and 6:10 a.m., reducing headways from ten to five minutes.

By 1934, service south of the City Hall station had been discontinued, and late night service ran from Pelham Bay Park to 125th Street only, being replaced by local service on the 4, which had previously run express.

Under the New York City Board of Transportation 
Effective December 31, 1945, City Hall station closed with the former Brooklyn Bridge station (renamed to Brooklyn Bridge–City Hall) being the permanent southern terminal. However, the 6 train still uses the loop to get from the southbound to the northbound local track at Brooklyn Bridge–City Hall.

On May 10, 1946, late-night service was extended from 125th Street to its previous terminus at Brooklyn Bridge when late night express service on the 4 was restored.

Beginning October 14, 1946, weekday rush and Saturday morning rush peak direction express service started, with Pelham Bay trains using the middle track between East 177th Street and Third Avenue–138th Street. This express service saved eight minutes between Third Avenue and East 177th Street. During this time, 6 trains that ran local in the Bronx when express trains operated began to terminate at East 177 Street to make room for express trains to Pelham Bay Park. On March 7, 1949, the hours of the evening Bronx-bound express service were advanced from 4:30 to 3:30 p.m., and on June 17, 1949, the hours of the morning Manhattan-bound express service were extended from 9:30 to 10:30 a.m.

On September 22, 1948, 54 additional cars were placed in service on the 6 train, increasing the lengths of trains from six cars to seven cars.

The New York City Board of Transportation, predecessor to the New York City Transit Authority, began to introduce replacements to older subway cars beginning with the R12 cars in 1948. With these cars, numbers were publicly designated to the former IRT lines. Lexington–Pelham trains were assigned the number 6. By 1964, all cars had the route numbers on them.

From December 15 to December 22, 1950, the weekday rush hour trains from Pelham Bay Park were extended to South Ferry.

Under the New York City Transit Authority 
On June 23, 1956, Saturday morning express service began operating local. On March 1, 1960, late night express service on the 4 was suspended when the 4 and 6 ran local in Manhattan together. On April 8, 1960, late night and weekend evening trains were extended to South Ferry. On October 17, 1965, late night 4 service began running express once again, and weekend evening 6 service was extended to South Ferry. Trains were cut back from South Ferry to Brooklyn Bridge on May 23, 1976.

Beginning on January 13, 1980, late night service terminated at 125th Street in Manhattan with the  again making all stops south of there. This service cut affected 15,000 riders, and was criticized by Manhattan Borough President Andrew Stein as no public hearing was held. On the same day, Bronx express service was expanded to operate during middays, with Pelham Bay trains running express in the peak direction to Brooklyn Bridge in the morning, then to Pelham Bay Park in the afternoon.

For a few months in 1985, one scheduled daily 6 train traveled to Atlantic Avenue in Brooklyn before turning for Pelham Bay Park.

From January 21 to October 5, 1990, late night service was extended back to Brooklyn Bridge when late night express service on the 4 was restored. But the 6 was then cut back to 125th Street for the last time when late-night express service on the 4 in Manhattan was permanently discontinued.

Effective October 3, 1999, the 4 and 6 trains once again began to operate local together in Manhattan late nights when the 6 train was permanently extended back to Brooklyn Bridge.

Route

Service pattern 
The following table shows the lines used by 6 and <6>, with shaded boxes indicating the route at the specified times:

Stations 

For a more detailed station listing, see the articles on the lines listed above.

References

External links 

 MTA NYC Transit – 6 Lexington Avenue / Pelham Local
 MTA NYC Transit – 6 Lexington Avenue Local / Pelham Express
 
 

New York City Subway services